Johann Schulz (date of birth unknown, died 1942) was a German swimmer. He competed in the men's 100 metre backstroke event at the 1928 Summer Olympics. He is believed to have gone missing in action in 1942 during World War II.

References

1942 deaths
German male swimmers
Olympic swimmers of Germany
Swimmers at the 1928 Summer Olympics
Place of birth missing
Male backstroke swimmers
German military personnel killed in World War II
Missing in action of World War II
Year of birth missing